Friedrich Wilhelm Gottlieb Theophil Rostkovius (1770–1848) was a German physician, mycologist and botanist.

In 1801, he received his doctorate from the University of Halle with the thesis Dissertatio Botanica Inauguralis De Iunco (treatise on rushes). He later settled in Stettin as a medical practitioner.

The plant genus Rostkovia from the family Juncaceae was named in his honor by Nicaise Auguste Desvaux (1784-1856). His name is also associated with the species Euphrasia rostkoviana.

Written works
Monographia generis iunci, 1801; with Philipp Friedrich Theodor Meckel (1755–1803).
Flora Sedinensis, exhibens plantas phanerogamas spontaneas nec non plantas praecipuas agri Swinemundii, 1824; with  Wilhelm Ludwig Ewald Schmidt (1805–1843).
Die Pilze Deutschlands: Deutschlands Flora in Abbildungen nach der Natur mit Beschreibungen. Abt. 3, Volume 5; Volumes 21–22, 1844; with August Karl Joseph Corda (1809–1849) - German fungi : German flora in pictures from nature with descriptions.
Deutschlands Flora in Abbildungen nach der Natur mit Beschreibungen, 1844; with Jacob Sturm (1771–1848) and Johann Wilhelm Sturm (1808–1865) - German flora in pictures from nature with descriptions.

References

1770 births
1848 deaths
University of Halle alumni
19th-century German botanists
German mycologists